Ardisia byrsonimae is a species of plant in the family Primulaceae. It is endemic to Jamaica.

References

byrsonimae
Critically endangered plants
Endemic flora of Jamaica
Taxonomy articles created by Polbot